Sir Anthony Rous (c.1555–1620), of Halton, near St Dominic in Cornwall, was an English landowner and a Member of Parliament between 1584 and 1604.

He was born the eldest son of Richard Rous of Rogate, Sussex. He succeeded his Uncle John soon after 1577 and was knighted in 1603. He possessed almost 10,000 acres of land and was one of Cornwall's richest residents.

He was elected MP for East Looe in Cornwall in 1584 and for Cornwall in 1604. He was selected High Sheriff of Cornwall for  1587–88 and 1602–03.

He first married Elizabeth Southcote, daughter of Thomas Southcote, of Bovey Tracey and Mohuns Ottery (1528-1600). This marriage produced four sons, firstly Ambrose Rous (d.1620) and lastly Francis Rous (c.1581-1659).

Coat of arms

References

1550s births
1620 deaths
People from Cornwall
English landowners
English MPs 1584–1585
English MPs 1604–1611
High Sheriffs of Cornwall
Southcott family